Balthis House, also known as E.C. Balthis Blacksmith Shop Property and Balthis' Old Stand, is a historic home located at Front Royal, Warren County, Virginia. The original section was built about 1787, and is a two-story, five bay, timber-frame vernacular Federal style dwelling. The original section is three bay and the house was expanded to its present size in the mid-19th century, at the same time as the addition of the two-story brick rear ell.  Also on the property are the contributing kitchen dependency and playhouse / gazebo.

The house is now owned by the Warren Heritage Society and is open for tours.

The house was listed on the National Register of Historic Places in 2004. It is located in the Front Royal Historic District.

References

External links
 Balthis House - Warren Heritage Society

Houses on the National Register of Historic Places in Virginia
Federal architecture in Virginia
Houses completed in 1787
Houses in Warren County, Virginia
National Register of Historic Places in Warren County, Virginia
Museums in Warren County, Virginia
Historic house museums in Virginia
Individually listed contributing properties to historic districts on the National Register in Virginia
Front Royal, Virginia
1787 establishments in Virginia